Rahil Azam (born 25 September 1981) is an Indian actor and model, who has appeared as Hatim in Hatim, as Nakul in CID, as JD in Tu Aashiqui, as DSP Anubhav Singh in Maddam Sir, and as Rahul/Ajinkya in Achanak 37 Saal Baad.

Early life and education
Azam was born 25 September 1981 in Bangalore, India. He has one elder sister.

Azam did his schooling from Clarence High School and graduation in software engineering from B.M.S. College of Engineering. In 1999, Azam came to Mumbai to pursue his engineering career. He took acting classes for three months. 

He is also employed in his family business in Bangalore.

Career
Azam had started his career as a software engineer. After shifting to Mumbai, he started his career as a model, Then he made his television debut in 2001 with the role of a romantic boy Akash Kapoor in daily soap Ek Tukdaa Chaand Ka. The story revolves around a small town girl who follows her lover into the city but is ditched by him. Later he appeared in episodic roles in horror show Ssshhhh...Koi Hai on Star Plus. After that he did another horror show Achanak 37 Saal Baad. Azam also played in Bhabhi as Rakesh.

In 2003, Azam played the lead in Sagar Films' adventure-fantasy drama series Hatim on Star Plus. The story starts with the birth of the emperor of Yemen's son, Hatim.

Later in May 2004, Azam featured as the male lead role of Ashmit Malhotra in Vipul D. Shah's drama show Ye Meri Life Hai, he wad nominated for the Best Actor in a Negative - Male at Indian Telly Awards. After he played the role of Suraj Kiran in Saarrthi.

In 2005, he did an episodic role in C.I.D, where he played the negative character of ACP Pradyuman (played by Shivaji Satam)'s son, Nakul. Azam came back in C.I.D. on 2 January 2015, to take revenge from his father as a terrorist in the episode "Nakul Returns".

In August 2006, Azam featured as the male lead in Hats Off Productions's drama series Resham Dankh, wherein he portrayed the role of Aditya Balraj, a business tycoon, opposite Mouli Ganguly. The show is based on a Gujarati magazine Chitralekha. It is a story of a successful business tycoon who have silk business or reshama and a happy family but with a twist. Aditya gives up himself to police stating that he had committed a murder. As soon as he enters the prison he decided to write memoirs through a story.

In July 2007, Azam was chosen to play the pivotal role in Contiloe Entertainment's horror television series Ssshhhh...Phir Koi Hai, where he played the role of Aryaamaan, a protector who saves people from the dark forces, in a special series named Ssshhhh...Phir Koi Hai - Aryaamaan.

In 2008, Azam was approached for play the dual character of a woman and man as a split personality in Ratna Sinha's show Babul Ka Aangann Chootey Na, for which he received a nomination in the Best Actor category at Indian Television Academy Awards.

In March 2009, Azam was approached for the lead role of Raka in Sunil Vohra's show Seeta Aur Geeta, but he was out of the show due to Malaria. Thereafter he played the lead role of Abhimanyu Mishra in Sahara One's TV show Mr. & Mrs. Mishra. The show about a team of UNIT 9 cops who specialise in solving complicated cases. Mr. & Mrs. Mishra will explore a different aspect of crime and investigation.

In 2010, Azam featured as the male lead in Sphere Origins's drama show Gulaal, where he portrayed the role of Vasant, opposite Manasi Parekh. It is the story of a young girl, Gulaal, who is very lively and positive in life. She has a unique gift of finding water in the dry lands of a desert. A neighbouring village has been facing a harsh and long drought. Vasant learns of Gulaal's gift and takes up in his stride to find Gulaal. Eventually their love blossoms and they get married.

In July 2012, Azam was chosen to play the pivotal role of Dr. Yudhistir in Fireworks Productions' suspense/thriller series Hum Ne Li Hai... Shapath, opposite Sargun Mehta. The story revolved around a murder that took place at a rave party.

Following the year's end, Azam essayed the negative role of Zara's (Rati Pandey) husband, Malik Khan. He started shooting for the show on 12 September 2012, where his character had have mysterious shades to it and is said to be loosely inspired from Aamir Khan's character in Fanaa.

In July 2013, Azam was approached for the role of Vanraj in Sanjay Leela Bhansali's show Saraswatichandra, but he was out of the show and replaced by Anshul Trivedi.

In 2015, Azam essayed the negative role of Dansh – the head of Naagvansh in Arvind Babbal's mytho-thriller show Maha Kumbh: Ek Rahasaya, Ek Kahani on Life OK. The story tells about the fight between the Garudas and Naagvansh where the Garudas got together for protecting positive Amrit, the evil Naags have arrived to take the Amrit.

Following the programme's end, Azam featured as the male lead role of Chander opposite Umang Jain in life OK's mini-series Ek Tha Chander Ek Thi Sudha an adaptation of popular 1949 Hindi novel, Gunahon Ka Devta by Dharmveer Bharti. It is the story of a young and mischievous Sudha and researcher Chandar who is a protege of her father. The bond that Chandar and Sudha share is that of two good-humoured, inseparable friends, and neither understands that their relationship may have a name.

In 2017 to 2018, he played the role of Jayant Dhanrajgir in the Colors TV's show Tu Aashiqui. In February 2020, he appear in Star Plus's Dil Jaise Dhadke... Dhadakne Do as Shivraj "Devguru" Singh.

In November 2020, he joined Sab TV's show Maddam Sir in the role of Anubhav Singh, DSP of Lucknow.

Filmography

Films

Television

Music videos

Web series

Awards and nominations

References

External links
 
 

Living people
1981 births
21st-century Indian male actors
Indian male soap opera actors
Indian male television actors
Male actors from Bangalore
Male actors from Mumbai
Male actors in Hindi television
Male actors in Kannada television
Participants in Indian reality television series